Kenneth Eugene Wilburn (June 8, 1944 – October 6, 2016) was an American professional basketball player. He played college basketball for the Central State Marauders from 1962 to 1966 and set a career scoring record. He led the team to an National Association of Intercollegiate Athletics (NAIA) championship in 1965. Wilburn played professionally in the National Basketball Association (NBA), American Basketball Association (ABA), and the Eastern Professional Basketball League (EPBL)/Eastern Basketball Association (EBA). Wilburn was a three-time EPBL/EBA champion with the Allentown Jets. He won the EPBL Most Valuable Player award in 1968 with the Trenton Colonials and the EBA Most Valuable Player award with the Allentown Jets in 1974.

Wilburn joined the NBA's Chicago Bulls in November 1967 to provide reinforcement after the team had lost several players to injuries. He returned to the team for the 1968–69 season, but was waived in November 1968.

Wilburn became a school teacher after his retirement from playing and taught at Chelsea Heights Elementary School in Atlantic City, New Jersey. He was indicted on December 21, 1996, on charges that he sexually assaulted six students on school field trips and in his home between September 1990 and June 1995.

References

External links 
 Career statistics at https://www.basketball-reference.com
 Draft information at http://www.thedraftreview.com/

1944 births
2016 deaths
Allentown Jets players
American men's basketball players
Basketball players from Michigan
Central State Marauders basketball players
Chicago Bulls players
Denver Rockets players
Lancaster Red Roses (CBA) players
Minnesota Pipers players
New York Nets players
Philadelphia 76ers draft picks
Small forwards